The Nasty Boys are a Marvel Comics supervillain team.

Nasty Boy(s) may also refer to:

 Nasty Boys (film), a 1989 American television film
 Nasty Boys (TV series), a 1990 series based on the film
 Nasty Boys (Cincinnati Reds), a 1990s trio of baseball relief pitchers
 The Nasty Boys, a professional wrestling team
 A Nasty Boy, a Nigerian LGBTQ magazine
 "Nasty Boy", a song by The Notorious B.I.G. from Life After Death

See also 
 Nasty (disambiguation)
 Nasty Girl (disambiguation)
 Naughty Boy (disambiguation)